Events from the year 1969 in Canada.

Incumbents

Crown 
 Monarch – Elizabeth II

Federal government 
 Governor General – Roland Michener
 Prime Minister – Pierre Trudeau
 Chief Justice – John Robert Cartwright (Ontario)
 Parliament – 28th

Provincial governments

Lieutenant governors 
Lieutenant Governor of Alberta – Grant MacEwan  
Lieutenant Governor of British Columbia – John Robert Nicholson 
Lieutenant Governor of Manitoba – Richard Spink Bowles 
Lieutenant Governor of New Brunswick – Wallace Samuel Bird 
Lieutenant Governor of Newfoundland – Fabian O'Dea (until April 2) then Ewart John Arlington Harnum 
Lieutenant Governor of Nova Scotia – Victor de Bedia Oland  
Lieutenant Governor of Ontario – William Ross Macdonald
Lieutenant Governor of Prince Edward Island – Willibald Joseph MacDonald (until October 6) then John George MacKay 
Lieutenant Governor of Quebec – Hugues Lapointe 
Lieutenant Governor of Saskatchewan – Robert Hanbidge

Premiers 
Premier of Alberta – Harry Strom   
Premier of British Columbia – W.A.C. Bennett 
Premier of Manitoba – Walter Weir (until July 15) then Edward Schreyer  
Premier of New Brunswick – Louis Robichaud 
Premier of Newfoundland – Joey Smallwood 
Premier of Nova Scotia – G.I. Smith  
Premier of Ontario – John Robarts 
Premier of Prince Edward Island – Alexander B. Campbell 
Premier of Quebec – Jean-Jacques Bertrand
Premier of Saskatchewan – Ross Thatcher

Territorial governments

Commissioners 
 Commissioner of Yukon – James Smith 
 Commissioner of Northwest Territories – Stuart Milton Hodgson

Events

January 29 – February 11 – The Sir George Williams Computer Riot occurs as students occupy the computer centre of Sir George Williams University to protest alleged racism on campus
February 13 – FLQ terrorists bomb the Montreal Stock Exchange
February 19 – An 18-month-long strike by Quebec teachers comes to an end
March 7 – Pierre-Paul Geoffroy pleads guilty to charges connected to 31 FLQ bombings
April 18 – New Brunswick adopts an Official Languages Act mandating that government services be available in both English and French
May 2 – Telesat Canada formed
June 2 – The National Arts Centre in Ottawa opens 
June 27 – Parliament decriminalizes consensual homosexual sex, with some exceptions
July 7 – The Official Languages Act makes French and English equal throughout the Canadian government
July 15 – Edward Schreyer becomes premier of Manitoba, replacing Walter Weir
August 24 – The oil tanker Manhattan becomes the first such ship to travel through the Northwest Passage
September 27- The Ontario Science Centre in Toronto opens
October 23 – at 8:21 am  suffers the worst peacetime accident in the history of the navy during routine full-power trials when her starboard gearbox reaches an estimated temperature of 650 degrees Celsius and explodes.  The explosion and the ensuing fire killed 9 crew members and injured at least 53 others.

Arts and literature

New works
Margaret Atwood - The Edible Woman
Timothy Findley - The Butterfly Plague
Robert Kroetsch - The Studhorse Man
Mordecai Richler - The Street
Milton Acorn - I've Tasted My Blood
Farley Mowat - The Boat Who Wouldn't Float
Gilles Archambault - Le tendre matin
Marshall McLuhan - Counterblast

Awards
See 1969 Governor General's Awards for a complete list of winners and finalists for those awards.
Stephen Leacock Award: Stuart Trueman, You're Only as Old as You Act
Vicky Metcalf Award: Audrey McKim

Music
Karel Ančerl replaces Seiji Ozawa as music director of the Toronto Symphony Orchestra

Sports
March 9 – The Toronto Varsity Blues win their third University Cup by defeating the Sir George Williams Georgians 4 to 2. The final game was played at Edmonton Gardens.
April 8  – The Montreal Expos win their first game by defeating the New York Mets 11–10 at Shea Stadium in Queens.
April 14 – The Montreal Expos win their first home game by defeating the St.Louis Cardinals  8 to 7 at  Jarry Park Stadium in Montreal.
May 4 – The Montreal Canadiens win their 16th Stanley Cup by defeating the St. Louis Blues 4 games to 0. Landrienne, Quebec's Serge Savard is awarded the Conn Smythe Trophy.
May 5 – The Ontario Hockey Association's Montreal Jr. Canadiens win their third Memorial Cup by defeating the Saskatchewan Junior Hockey League's Regina Pats 4 games to 0. The deciding game 4 was played at Regina Exhibition Stadium.
November 21 – The Manitoba Bisons win their first Vanier Cup by defeating the McGill Redmen by a score of 24–15 in the 5th Vanier Cup played at Varsity Stadium in Toronto.
November 30 – The Ottawa Rough Riders won their seventh Grey Cup by defeating the Saskatchewan Roughriders 29 to 11 in the 57th Grey Cup at Montreal's Autostade. Hamilton, Ontario's Russ Jackson became the first Canadian to be the game's official MVP.

Births

January to March
January 2 - Patrick Huard, actor
January 3 - Tom Petryshen, wrestler
January 11 - Andrew Griffiths, field hockey player
January 23 - Brendan Shanahan, ice hockey player
January 24 - Mike Spencer Bown, world traveler and author
January 27 - Michael Kulas, singer-songwriter and producer (James)
February 4
Duncan Coutts, bass player and songwriter (Our Lady Peace)
Dallas Drake, ice hockey player and coach
February 11 - Lee Tockar, voice actor
February 16 - Claude Lambert, boxer
February 22 - Kathy Tough, volleyball player

April to June
April 3 - Lance Storm, wrestler
April 7 - Gary Anderson, swimmer
April 19 - Andrew Carnie, linguist, author, and academic
May 6 - Raymond Brown, swimmer

May 15 - Mark Jackson, hurdler
May 16 - Yannick Bisson, actor (Murdoch Mysteries)
May 19 
 Dan Lee, animator (d. 2005)
 Rochelle Low, field hockey player
May 28 - Rob Ford, politician and 64th Mayor of Toronto
June 11 - Bryan Fogarty, ice hockey player (d. 2002)
June 12 - Kelvin Goertzen, politician

July to September
July 7 - Joe Sakic, ice hockey player
July 7 - Cree Summer, actress, musician and voice actress
July 13 - Ewan Beaton, judoka
July 16 - Turlough O'Hare, swimmer
July 17 - Tom Glesby, boxer
July 17 - Laurelee Kopeck, field hockey player
July 23 - Andrew Cassels, ice hockey player
July 24 - Rick Fox, basketball player and actor
August 5 - Kati Dagenais, world champion musher, an athlete in sled-dog racing
August 6 - Kristyn Dunnion, writer and performance artist
August 15 - Mark Heese, beach volleyball player and Olympic bronze medallist
August 19 - Matthew Perry, actor
August 23 - Hari Kant, field hockey player
August 28 - Pierre Turgeon, ice hockey player

September 16 - Andy Borodow, wrestler
September 23 - Donald Audette, ice hockey player

October to December
October 6 - Jeffrey Lay, rower and Olympic silver medallist
October 8 - Dylan Neal, actor
October 17 - Rick Mercer, comedian, television personality and political satirist
November 1 - Tie Domi, ice hockey player
November 7 - Tanya Dubnicoff, track cyclist
November 15 - Helen Kelesi, tennis player
December 4 - Jacques Landry, cyclist
December 10 - Rob Blake, ice hockey player
December 12 - Iain Sydie, badminton player
December 12
Debra Wurzburger, swimmer
Kris Wirtz, pair skater
December 15 - Chantal Petitclerc, wheelchair racer and multiple Paralympic gold medallist
December 22 - Myriam Bédard, biathlete and double Olympic gold medallist
December 30 - Shane McConkey, extreme skier and base jumper (d.2009)

Deaths

January to June
January 4 – Arthur Mørch Hansson, Norwegian diplomat (b. 1910).
January 19 - Arthur Bourinot, poet
January 31 - Gail Miller, murder victim (b. circa 1948)
February 27 - Marius Barbeau, ethnographer and folklorist (b.1883)
March 18 - John Bracken, politician and 11th Premier of Manitoba (b.1883)
March 23 - Arthur Lismer, painter and member of the Group of Seven (b.1885)
June 16 - Harold Alexander, 1st Earl Alexander of Tunis, military commander and Governor General of Canada (b.1891)

July to December
August 1 - Fred Landon, historian (b.1880)
September 8 - Frederick Varley, artist and member of the Group of Seven (b.1881)
September 12 - Charles Foulkes, General, first Chairman of the Chiefs of Staff, negotiated the WWII Nazi surrender in the Netherlands (b.1903)
October 10 - Robert Winters, politician and businessman (b.1910)
November 3 - Parr, artist (b.1893)
November 11 - John Sissons, barrister, author, judge and politician (b.1892)
November 14 - Bobbie Rosenfeld, athlete and Olympic gold medallist (b.1904)

See also
 1969 in Canadian television
 List of Canadian films

References

 
Years of the 20th century in Canada
Canada
1969 in North America